The Bay City metropolitan area may refer to:

The Bay City, Michigan metropolitan area, United States
The Bay City, Texas micropolitan area, United States

See also
Bay City (disambiguation)